Orazio Bacci (18 October 1864, Castelfiorentino – 25 December 1917) was an Italian Liberal Party politician. He was the 12th mayor of Florence, Kingdom of Italy. He died in Rome.

Other works
O. Bacci (pubblicate per cura di), Ninne-nanne cantilene canzoni di giuochi e filastrocche che si dicono in Valdelsa, Firenze, Loesher & Seeber, 1891;
O. Bacci, Un nuovo testo dei "Sonetti dei Mesi" di Folgore da S.Gemignano e un "Cantare dell'abbandonata da Siena" nel codice riccardiano 1158, Estratto dalla «Miscellanea storica della Valdelsa» (Anno V, fasc. 2 - Della serie, n. 13) - Castelfiorentino. Tip. Giovannelli e Carpitelli;
O. Bacci, Inventario degli oggetti lasciati da S. Bernardino da Siena, Nozze Del Lungo-Sani, IV agosto MDCCCXCV, Castelfiorenino, Tipografia Giovannelli e Carpitelli;
O. Bacci, Prosa e prosatori. Scritti storici e teorici, Milano-Palermo-Napoli, Sandron Editore, s. d. (ma 1907).

References

Bibliography
 A. Frattini, in Dizionario Biografico degli Italiani, vol. V, Roma, Istituto della Enciclopedia Italiana, 1963, voce Bacci, Orazio.
E. Esposito, in Enciclopedia Dantesca, vol. I, Roma, Istituto della enciclopedia Italiana, 1996 (in tiratura limitata a 2499 esemplari), voce "Bacci, Orazio".
 G.Levantini-Pieroni, Nelle nozze Del Lungo-Bacci, Il Dottore Angiolo Del Lungo, Firenze, Le Monnier, 1895 [strenna di nozze]
 Romilda Del Lungo, in Prefazionde  Orazio Bacci, La lampada della vita, Firenze, Bemporad [opera postuma], 1920.
 Abba Luzzatto Fegiz, Dizionario Generale degli Autori Italiani contemporanei, vol. 1, Firenze, Vallecchi, 1974, voce Orazio Bacci.
 S. Gensini, Orazio Bacci: la sua Società e la sua rivista, in Orazio Bacci. Un letterato vadelsano, Convegno di studio (Firenze-Castelfiorentino, 6-7 novembre 1987), «MSV», XCV (1989), 1-2 pp. 43–82.
A. Marsini, Orazio Bacci: «Dal suo carteggio», ivi, pp. 37–41.
M. Raicich, L'Officina del Manuale, ivi, pp. 93–123.
M. Marchi, Orazio Bacci e la prosa, ivi, pp. 157–165.

1864 births
1917 deaths
People from Castelfiorentino
19th-century Italian politicians
20th-century Italian politicians
Mayors of Florence